The Journal of the Kansas Entomological Society is a quarterly peer-reviewed scientific journal published by the Kansas Entomological Society. The journal has a 2009 impact factor of 0.607.

References 

Entomology journals and magazines
Publications established in 1928
English-language journals
Quarterly journals
Academic journals published by learned and professional societies of the United States